Aotea Lagoon is an artificial lagoon surrounded by a  public park
in the Papakowhai suburb of Porirua, North Island, New Zealand.
Aotea and two nearby lagoons were created when major arterial transport links were realigned
from the natural coastline to land reclaimed from Porirua Harbour.

Hydrology
connected to Porirua Harbour by a culvert
under the model windmill.
Stormwater drains empty into the lagoon:
two in the east bank and a third in the south-east.

The lagoon's 
"water body receives limited flushing and aeration" and "little can be done to improve water quality without extensive engineering works."
Poor water quality means swimming is prohibited.

History
The North Island Main Trunk railway and State Highway 1 used to run round three bays between Porirua and Paremata. 

In the early 1960s, the railway was realigned to a causeway built between 
promontories at the mouth of Porirua Stream, Gear Homestead, present-day Thurso Grove and Brora Crescent. 
Cut off from the sea, the bays became lagoons.

To realign the highway, inland of the railway, the lagoons were partly filled in with material from the 
Ministry of Works and Development's nearby earthworks.

The Ministry, Porirua City Council, Project Employment Programme and local service clubs turned the area around the middle lagoon into a public aquatic park that opened as Aotea Lagoon in 1980.
Originally leased from the Crown, the park was taken over by the City Council in 1994.

In 2021 the road along the western edge of all three lagoons became State Highway 59.

Facilities

The park's centrepiece is a path around the lagoon.

The Waitangirua Lions built a ¼ scale ridable miniature railway with an  loop track including two bridges and a tunnel.
The train runs Sunday afternoon, weather and maintenance permitting, from Pipitea Station south-west of the lagoon. 

The park has lawns north, east and south-west of the lagoon some with barbecues.
Other facilities, from the north to south-west, are Butterfly Walkway Porirua, adventure and toddlers's playgrounds, splash pad, island reached by bridge, Pétanque terrain and a rose garden. 

Most people visit Aotea Lagoon for exercise or relaxation while children enjoy the playgrounds, feeding the ducks, riding bicycles and the train.

Notes

References
 
 
 
 
 
 

Lagoons of New Zealand
Porirua
Landforms of the Wellington Region
Parks in the Wellington Region